The 2011 Indy Japan: The Final was the ninth and final running of the Indy Japan 300 and the sixteenth round of the 2011 IndyCar Series season. It took place on Sunday September 18, 2011. The race was contested over 63 laps at the  Twin Ring Motegi road course in Motegi, Tochigi, Japan. This event was to be contested on the  oval but due to the damage which was brought to the oval during the Tōhoku earthquake and tsunami, six months earlier, the series decided to replace the event from the damaged oval to the still intact road course.

Indy Japan: The Final
Indy Japan: The Final
Indy Japan 300
September 2011 sports events in Japan